Vivian Jilling Kingma (born 23 October 1994) is a Dutch cricketer. He played for the Netherlands in the 2014 ICC World Twenty20 tournament. He was initially selected in the Netherlands' squad for the 2015 ICC World Twenty20 Qualifier tournament in July 2015, but was replaced by Roelof van der Merwe. He made his Twenty20 International debut for the Netherlands against Scotland on 5 February 2016.

In December 2017, he took a hat-trick and his first five-wicket haul in List A cricket while playing for the Netherlands against Namibia in the 2015–17 ICC World Cricket League Championship.

In July 2019, he was selected to play for the Rotterdam Rhinos in the inaugural edition of the Euro T20 Slam cricket tournament. However, the following month the tournament was cancelled. In April 2020, he was one of seventeen Dutch-based cricketers to be named in the team's senior squad.

In January 2022, following the Dutch ODI series against Afghanistan in Qatar, Kingma was found guilty of ball tampering during the third ODI, and was given a four-match ban.

References

1994 births
Living people
Dutch cricketers
Netherlands One Day International cricketers
Netherlands Twenty20 International cricketers
Sportspeople from The Hague